Ardal County is in Chaharmahal and Bakhtiari province, Iran. The capital of the county is the city of Ardal. At the 2006 census, the county's population was 68,740 in 14,474 households. The following census in 2011 counted 53,514 people, in 12,703 households, by which time parts of the Central District had been separated from the county to participate in the formation of Kiar County. At the 2016 census, the county's population was 48,880 in 13,066 households.

Administrative divisions

The population history and structural changes of Ardal County's administrative divisions over three consecutive censuses are shown in the following table. The latest census shows two districts, four rural districts, and two cities.

References

 

Counties of Chaharmahal and Bakhtiari Province